Peter Jonathan Rutledge is a New Zealand chemist and professor at the School of Chemistry, University of Sydney. His research has focused on drug development for tuberculosis, antibiotics, and metal sensing. He has engaged in some research activity on catalysis.

Education
Rutledge received his BSc in chemistry and biochemistry from the University of Auckland in 1993. He received his MSc from the same institution with first class honours in chemistry in 1995. He left New Zealand in 1995 and obtained his DPhil at Magdalen College, Oxford working with Jack Edward Baldwin in 1999. He was a postdoctoral research fellow at the same institution until 2003.

Career and research
Rutledge has held college lectureships at Magdalen College, Oxford, from 2000 to 2001 and Somerville College, Oxford, from 2001 to 2002. In 2003, he moved to become a lecturer at the Centre for Synthesis and Chemical Biology at University College Dublin. In 2006, he relocated to the University of Sydney and was an associate professor during the years 2014 to 2019. In 2019, he was promoted to a full professor of chemistry. At the University of Sydney, Rutledge regularly collaborated with the group of Matthew H. Todd until his departure to University College London in 2018.

Honours and awards

 2012 – Pearson Education RACI Centenary of Federation Chemistry Educator of the Year Award
 2011 – Vice-Chancellor's Award for Outstanding Teaching
 2011 – Australian Learning and Teaching Council Citation for Teaching Excellence
 2010 – Vice-Chancellor's Award for Support of the Student Experience
 2008 – NSW and ACT Young Tall Poppy Science Award
 2007 – RACI Athel Beckwith Lectureship
 2006 – RACI Nyholm Lectureship

References 

Living people
Organic chemists
New Zealand scientists
Academic staff of the University of Sydney
New Zealand chemists
Fellows of Somerville College, Oxford
Year of birth missing (living people)